Malta is set to participate in the Eurovision Song Contest 2023 in Liverpool, United Kingdom. The Maltese entry for the 2023 contest will be performed by the band the Busker, who won the national final Malta Eurovision Song Contest 2023 with their song "Dance (Our Own Party)", organised by the Maltese broadcaster Public Broadcasting Services (PBS). The competition consisted of three quarter-finals, a semi-final and a final, held in January and February 2023.

Background 

Prior to the 2023 contest, Malta had participated in the Eurovision Song Contest thirty-four times since its first entry in 1971. Malta briefly competed in the Eurovision Song Contest in the 1970s before withdrawing for sixteen years. The country had competed in every contest between their return in 1991, and 2022. In , Malta failed to qualify for the final with the song "I Am What I Am" performed by Emma Muscat.

The Maltese national broadcaster, Public Broadcasting Services (PBS), broadcast the event within Malta and organised the selection process for the nation's entry. The broadcaster opted to select the Maltese entry for the 2022 contest during a national selection show titled Malta Eurovision Song Contest, a process that will be continued for their 2023 entry.

Before Eurovision

Malta Eurovision Song Contest 2023 
Malta Eurovision Song Contest 2023 was the national final format developed by PBS to select the Maltese entry for the Eurovision Song Contest 2023. The competition consisted of three quarter-finals, a semi-final and final held between 13 January 2023 and 11 February 2023. All shows were broadcast on Television Malta (TVM) as well as on the broadcaster's website tvm.com.mt.

Format 
The competition consisted of 40 songs competing in three quarter-finals on 13, 20 and 27 January 2023. The top twenty-four entries qualified to compete in the semi-final on 9 February 2023 where the top sixteen entries qualified to compete in the final on 11 February 2023. Five judges evaluated the songs during all phases and their votes were combined with the results of the public televote, each having an equal weighting in the final result. Ties in the final results were broken based on the entry which received the higher score from the judges. Monetary prizes were also given to the competing artists. The winner received €10,000, the runner-up received €4,000, the second runner-up received €2,000 and the remaining artists received €300 each. Former Maltese Eurovision entrants Paul Giordimaina (1991), Moira Stafrace (1994), Mike Spiteri (1995) and Ludwig Galea (2004) were appointed as consultants of the competition in order to offer support to the artists. The five members of the jury that evaluated the entries during all phases consisted of:

 Sergio Gor – Publisher
 Corazon Mizzi – Singer-songwriter
 Matthew Bugeja – Conductor
 Antoine Farrugia – Artistic director of Notte Bianca
 Dorothy Bezzina – Singer

Competing entries 
Artists and composers were able to submit their entries between 17 October 2022 and 31 October 2022. Songwriters from any nationality were able to submit songs as long as the artist were Maltese or possessed Maltese citizenship. Artists were able to submit as many songs as they wished, however, they could only compete with one in the quarter-finals. 2022 Maltese Eurovision entrant Emma Muscat was unable to compete due to a rule that prevented the previous winner from competing in the following competition. The 40 songs selected to compete in the quarter-finals were announced on 21 November 2022. Among the selected competing artists are former Eurovision entrants Fabizio Faniello who represented Malta in the 2001 and 2006 contests, Jessika who represented San Marino in the 2018 contest, Francesca Sciberras who represented Malta in the Junior Eurovision Song Contest 2009, and Eliana Gomez Blanco who represented Malta in the Junior Eurovision Song Contest 2019.

Shows

Quarter-finals 
The three quarter-finals took place on 13, 20 and 27 January 2023 were hosted by Ryan and Josmar. On 23 January 2023, Aidan was disqualified from the quarter-finals for violating the competition's social media promotion policy. The remaining thirty-nine songs competed for twenty-four qualifying spots in the semi-final. The allocation for the quarter-finals was announced on 6 January 2023.

Semi-final 
The semi-final took place on 9 February 2023 at the Malta Fairs and Conventions Centre in Ta' Qali and was hosted by former Maltese Eurovision entrants Glen Vella, who represented Malta in 2011, and Amber, who represented Malta in 2015. The twenty-four entries that qualified from the quarter-finals competed for sixteen qualifying spots in the final. The show was opened with a guest performance by Paul Giordimaina, Moira Stafrace, Mike Spiteri and Ludwig Galea, while the interval act featured a guest performance by the 2022 Maltese Junior Eurovision entrant Gaia Gambuzza performing "Diamonds in the Skies", and a medley of past non-winning songs in the Malta Eurovision Song Contest performed by Catherine Vigar, Claudia Faniello, Eleanor Cassar, Janice Mangion, Lawrence Gray, Olivia Lewis, Pamela Bezzina, Richard Micallef and Pamela Bezzina.

Final 

The final took place on 11 February 2023 at the Malta Fairs and Conventions Centre in Ta' Qali and was hosted by former Maltese Eurovision entrants Glen Vella, who represented Malta in 2011, and Amber, who represented Malta in 2015. The sixteen entries that qualified from the semi-final were performed again and the 50/50 combination of votes of a five-member jury panel and the results of public televoting determined the winner. The show was opened with a guest performance by the Annalise Dance Studio, while the interval act featured the show hosts Glen Vella and Amber, and performances by Aidan and the 2022 Maltese Eurovision entrant Emma Muscat performing "I Am What I Am". After the votes from the jury panel and televote were combined, "Dance (Our Own Party)" performed by the Busker was the winner.

Ratings

Controversy

Disqualification of Aidan 
On 23 January 2023, Aidan was disqualified from the competition due to "the engagement of marketing personnel, marketing officials, marketing companies or the engagement into some sort of marketing or promotional campaign or activity by the artists to promote themselves, the song, their participation, or in some way to influence the public vote" and "the publication of any social media posts, promotion material, interviews or any media presence from the announcement of the quarter-finalists onwards", which is in breach of the rules. Aidan had posted multiple unauthorised social media posts, despite having been warned repeatedly by PBS of potential disqualificaiton. An online petition was launched to bring the singer back into the competition, gaining over one thousand signatures. In response, Aidan's team threatened to take legal steps, unless he was allowed to participate in the contest, arguing that he had been singled out for punishment by the broadcaster, and claiming other contestants had also published a number of unauthorised social media posts. Aiden dropped his threat of a lawsuit on 31 January, citing the possibility that such an action could cause the cancelation of the entire selection event. The singer was instead invited to perform as an interval act during the final of Malta Eurovision Song Contest 2023, with the stipulation that he not sing his disqualified entry "Reġina".

At Eurovision 
According to Eurovision rules, all nations with the exceptions of the host country and the "Big Five" (France, Germany, Italy, Spain and the United Kingdom) are required to qualify from one of two semi-finals in order to compete for the final; the top ten countries from each semi-final progress to the final. The European Broadcasting Union (EBU) split up the competing countries into six different pots based on voting patterns from previous contests, with countries with favourable voting histories put into the same pot. On 31 January 2023, an allocation draw was held, which placed each country into one of the two semi-finals, and determined which half of the show they would perform in. Malta has been placed into the first semi-final, to be held on 9 May 2023, and has been scheduled to perform in the first half of the show.

References 

2023
Countries in the Eurovision Song Contest 2023
Eurovision